Hampstead Heath Woods is a  biological Site of Special Scientific Interest in Hampstead in the London Borough of Camden. It is in two separate areas within Hampstead Heath, North Wood between Kenwood House and Hampstead Lane, and the larger Ken Wood, south of Kenwood House.

The site has many old and over-mature trees, and extensive dead wood which provides a habitat for invertebrates, including the nationally rare jewel beetle Agrilus pannonicus. This type of canopy is uncommon nationally and very scarce in Greater London. The main trees are sessile oak and beech, with a few pedunculate oaks and wild service trees. The shrub layer is dominated by holly and rowan. Next to Ken Wood is a small valley which has soft-rush, six sphagnum species and water horsetail.

See also
 List of Sites of Special Scientific Interest in Greater London

References

Sites of Special Scientific Interest in London